Justin William Wells (born August 11, 1982) is an American country music and roots rock singer-songwriter. Wells has released two solo albums as well as four albums as singer/songwriter/rhythm guitarist for former Lexington, Kentucky alternative country/southern rock band Fifth on the Floor.

Personal life
Wells is married and lives with his wife in Lexington, Kentucky. They have identical twin daughters.

Career
Wells started writing songs and performing in high school. He moved to Lexington, Kentucky in 2005 to start a band, and a year later founded Fifth on the Floor. Fifth on the Floor self-released two albums, 2007's The Color of Whiskey and 2010's Dark and Bloody Ground. In 2013, they released their third full-length, Ashes & Angels, produced by multiple Grammy-winning producer/artist Shooter Jennings and released by Black Country Rock/Entertainment One. In January 2015, the band announced they were breaking up. Their final release, the EP & After, was released that same month.

On August 5, 2016, Wells released his debut solo album, Dawn in the Distance. The album was produced by Duane Lundy (Ringo Starr, Sturgill Simpson's Sunday Valley, Joe Pug, Vandaveer).

On August 9, 2018, Wells released a single, "A Love Song", as part of the 10 in 20 Series, a series that has featured a number of Grammy-winning and nominated artists, including Sturgill Simpson, Matt Duncan, and Justin Craig. The next day, Jason Eady released his album I Travel On, which included a co-write with Wells, "Pretty When I Die". Later that year, Wells released a physical-only 7" vinyl single that included a stripped-down version of "The Dogs" and a cover of Elton John's "Mona Lisas and Mad Hatters".

On August 28, 2020, Wells released his second studio album, The United State, produced by Duane Lundy.

Discography

Studio albums

Extended plays

Singles

Fifth on the Floor albums

Fifth on the Floor extended plays

Other album appearances

Videography

Other video appearances

Filmography

References

External links
 Official website

1982 births
Living people
American country singer-songwriters
American country rock singers
American rock singers
American male singer-songwriters
People from Bossier City, Louisiana
Musicians from Lexington, Kentucky
21st-century American singers
Country musicians from Louisiana
Country musicians from Kentucky
21st-century American male singers
Singer-songwriters from Louisiana